The Northeast Times may refer to:

The North East Times, an English daily published from Northeast India.
Northeast Times, an American newspaper.